RuPaul's Drag U was an American reality television series that aired from 2010-2012. In each episode of the series, three women are given drag makeovers and taught to access their "inner divas". Each is judged and evaluated on her "Drag Point Average", or "DPA": (also standing for drag transformation, performance and attitude adjustment). The contestant with the highest DPA wins.  RuPaul is the "President" of Drag U.

Series overview

Episodes

Season 1 (2010)

Season 2 (2011)

Season 3 (2012)

References

Lists of American non-fiction television series episodes
Drag U